Estela may refer to:

 Estela (Póvoa de Varzim), Portugal
 Estela, Buenos Aires, Argentina
 CD Estela, a Spanish basketball team

People with the given name 
 Estela Perlas-Bernabe (born 1952), Philippine jurist
 Estela de Carlotto (born 1930), Argentine human rights activist
 Estela Casas (born 1961), American news anchor
 Estela Domínguez (born 1969), Spanish volleyball player
 Estela García (born 1989), Spanish sprinter
 Estela Giménez (born 1979), Spanish rhythmic gymnast
 Estela Golovchenko (born 1963), Uruguayan playwright, actress, and theater director
 Estela Inda (1917–1995), Mexican actress
 Estela Jiménez Esponda, Mexican women's rights activist
 Estela Milanés (born 1967), Cuban softball player
 Estela Navascués (born 1981), Spanish long-distance runner
 Estela Portillo-Trambley (1936–1999), American poet and playwright
 Estela Quesada (1924–2011), Costa Rican lawyer and politician
 Estela Renner (born 1973), Brazilian filmmaker
 Estela Rodríguez (born 1967), Cuban judoka

Fictional characters
 Estela de la Cruz, a character in the Netflix series 13 Reasons Why

See also 
 Estella (disambiguation)
 Stella (disambiguation)